The Kandy Tuskers (abbreviated as KT) is a franchise cricket team which competed in inaugural season of Lanka Premier League in 2020. The team is based in Kandy, Central Province, Sri Lanka, and owned by Bollywood actor Sohail Khan. In the 2020 season, the team was under the captaincy of Kusal Perera and coached by Hashan Tillakaratne.

The team was eliminated in the inaugural season of the LPL after winning two out of eight matches. They were disqualified due to having a lower run rate than the qualifier, Galle Gladiators, which had the same winning streak.

Season summary
In the inaugural match of the Lanka Premier League, the Colombo Kings beat the Tuskers in a super over. In their 20 overs, the Tuskers scored 219/3. This was largely due to their captain Kusal Mendis, who scored 87 runs off 52 balls. While in the super over, the Tuskers scored 12/0 in reply to 16/1 by the Kings. On 28 November 2020, the Tuskers lost their second successive match by four runs, this time to the Dambulla Viiking, as the DLS method was used due to rain.

In their third match, they defeated Galle Gladiators by 25 runs to log their first win of the season. They won despite of 82 runs off 53 balls from the Gladiators opener Danushka Gunathilaka, as the Gladiators scored 171/7 in response to Kandy's 196/5. 
In their fourth game, the Tuskers were all out for 131 runs in response to the Jaffna Stallions' 185/8, losing the game by 54 runs.

In the Tuskers' fifth game of the season, against the Viiking, they got off to a good start. This was largely due to their captain Mendis, who scored 55 runs. However, the Tuskers still lost this game by five wickets. Yet again in their sixth game of the season, against the Colombo Kings, the Tuskers' batting failed them. Rahmanullah Gurbaz was the highest scorer for the Tuskers, scoring 34 runs off 21 balls. In response, the Kings reached their target inside 15 overs, winning by seven wickets and giving the Tuskers their third consecutive loss. This also sent the Kings into the semi-finals.

In their seventh game of the season, the Tuskers defeated the Jaffna Stallions by six runs. Their eighth match, against the Galle Gladiators, was a virtual quarter-final, with the winner advancing to the semi-final. The Tuskers' batting failed again, as the only batsman to pass 50 runs was their captain Mendis, who scored 68 runs of the Tuskers' total of 128 runs. The Tuskers bowlers could not replicate the Gladiators bowlers either, as they took only one wicket in the Gladiators' successful chase of 130/1. This meant that the Kandy Tuskers finished last on the inaugural Lanka Premier League table.

Squad

Administration and support staff
The team is owned by the Bollywood actor Sohail Khan, the brother of Salman Khan. It is also co-owned by Abbas Muni. Hashan Tillakaratne was appointed as the head coach, while the team manager was Farveez Maharoof.  Nuvan Kulasekara and Lanka De Silva were bowling and fielding coaches for the season, respectively.

Season standings

League table

Matches

Statistics

Most runs
The top scorer of Kandy Tuskers was Kusal Mendis, who scored 263 runs in eight matches, followed by the captain Kusal Perera, who scored 209 runs. The third and fourth position were attained by Rahmanullah Gurbaz and Asela Gunaratne.

Most wickets
The most wickets were taken by Gunaratne, who took nine wickets in eight matches. He was followed by Afghan cricketer Naveen-ul-Haq, who took eight wickets. Vishwa Fernando and Seekkuge Prasanna both took three wickets, respectively.

Awards and achievements

References

2020 Lanka Premier League